Edward Albert Chapin (1894-1969) was an American entomologist who erected the genus Brumoides in 1965.

References

"Brumoides Chapin, 1965". BioLib.cz. Retrieved March 13, 2018.

1894 births
1969 deaths
American entomologists
20th-century American zoologists